Pristimantis sulculus is a species of frog in the family Strabomantidae.
It is found in Colombia and possibly Ecuador.
Its natural habitats are tropical moist montane forests and rivers.
It is threatened by habitat loss.

References

sulculus
Amphibians of Colombia
Endemic fauna of Colombia
Amphibians described in 1990
Taxonomy articles created by Polbot